The Bargain  (1931) is an all-talking American pre-Code comedy drama film produced and released by First National Pictures, a subsidiary of Warner Bros., and directed by Robert Milton. The movie stars Lewis Stone, Evalyn Knapp, Charles Butterworth and Doris Kenyon. It was based on the 1923 play You and I by Philip Barry.

Preservation
The first four reels survive at the BFI archive.  The soundtrack, which was recorded on Vitaphone disks, may survive in private hands.

Cast
Lewis Stone as Maitland White
Evalyn Knapp as Vorencia
Charles Butterworth as Geoffrey 
Doris Kenyon as Nancy
John Darrow as Roderick White
Oscar Apfel as G.T. Warren 
Una Merkel as Etta
Nella Walker as The Patroness

References

External links

1931 films
First National Pictures films
Warner Bros. films
American black-and-white films
Films directed by Robert Milton
Lost American films
American comedy-drama films
1931 comedy-drama films
1931 lost films
Lost comedy-drama films
1930s English-language films
1930s American films